Love's Joys and Woes is a 1926 German silent comedy film and directed by Kurt Gerron and Heinz Schall and starring Charlotte Susa, Margarete Kupfer and Hilde Maroff.

The film's art direction was by Karl Machus.

Cast
 Charlotte Susa
 Margarete Kupfer
 Hilde Maroff
 Maria Forescu
 Emmy Wyda
 Marion Illing
 Grete Schmidt
 Sylvia Torf
 Hilda Pittschau
 Hans Mierendorff
 Ernst Rückert
 Fritz Rasp
 Kurt Gerron
 Charles Willy Kayser
 Hermann Picha
 Robert Garrison
 Ernst Behmer
 Ludwig Sachs
 Philipp Manning
 Antonie Jaeckel
 Albert Dettmann

References

Bibliography
 Hans-Michael Bock and Tim Bergfelder. The Concise Cinegraph: An Encyclopedia of German Cinema. Berghahn Books, 2009.

External links

1926 films
Films of the Weimar Republic
German silent feature films
Films directed by Kurt Gerron
German black-and-white films
German comedy films
1926 comedy films
Silent comedy films
1920s German films
1920s German-language films